The 2019 Imo State gubernatorial election in Nigeria occurred on March 9, 2019. PDP's Emeka Ihedioha polled 38.29% of the total votes, defeating APC's Uche Nwosu who got 26.66% of popular votes, and several minor party candidates. Out of 27 LGAs, Ihedioha won in 11, while Nwosu won in 10.

Ihedioha emerged winner at the gubernatorial primary after defeating Samuel Anyanwu. His running mate was Gerard Iroha.

Of the 70 candidates who aspired for the governorship seat, 66 were male, four were female.

Electoral system
The Governor of Imo State is elected using the plurality voting system.

Primary election

PDP primary
The PDP primary election earlier scheduled for 30 September 2018 began by 4:00 pm on Monday 1 October and ended about 4:30 am Tuesday 2 October 2018, held at the Kanu Nwankwo Sports Centre, Owerri. Over 3,000 delegates were present from the 27 LGAs of the state. Former Deputy Speaker, House of Representatives, Emeka Ihedioha emerged winner with 1,723 delegate votes defeating closest rival, Samuel Anyanwu, Senator representing Imo East with 1,282 votes. The exercise was declared to be peaceful by  the chairman gubernatorial primaries committee in Imo State, Emma Nwala, with jubilation in the air due to the election's conduct (although the delegates election was said to have been marked with irregularities). However, Anyanwu was said to have rejected the result and called for the cancellation and rerun of same. The only female contestant was also reported to have taken legal action against the winner. Other contestants include Athan Achonu who polled 63 votes, Prof. Jude Njoku 21 votes, Chukwuma Ekomaru (SAN) 7 votes and Chukwuemeka Ezeji 1 vote.

Candidates
Party nominee: Emeka Ihedioha: Incumbent governor.
Running mate: Gerald Irona.
 Samuel Anyanwu
 Athan Achonu
 Prof. Jude Njoku
 Chukwuma Ekomaru (SAN)
 Chukwuemeka Ezeji
 Irene Ottih

APC primary
The APC primary elections in Imo State was as reported, "unsettling the party". This could be traced back to few weeks before the election. It was held from 30 September to 1 October 2018 "amidst confusion". Two of the ten contestants, Uche Nwosu and Hope Uzodinma, were declared winners, consecutively, leading to a state of confusion.

Uzodinma was declared winner by the Chairman of Imo State governorship primary electoral committee, Ahmed Gulak, and said to have polled 423,895 votes, Prince Eze Madumere 128,325 votes, Ugwumba Uche Nwosu 10,329 votes, Sir George Eche 16,597 votes, Engr. Chuks Ololo 13,645 votes, Sir Jude Ejiogu 12,369 votes, Peter Gbujie 12,329 votes, Barr. Chima Anozie 11,071 votes, and Chris Nlemoha 9,253 votes. Nine of the 12 committee members, however, were said to have "disowned" him and declared Uche Nwosu winner. At the party's Secretariat in Owerri, nevertheless, the result, as announced by the committee secretary, Hon. Henry Idahagbon, had Uche Nwosu polling 455,655 votes, Air Commodore Peter Gbujie (rtd) 9,351 votes. The APC governorship primaries in Imo State was thereupon suspended from the party's national headquarters, with no reason given.

Vanguard Nigeria reported the electoral committee chairman, Ibrahim Agbabiaka, announcing Uche Nwosu, the former Chief of Staff to Imo state governor Rochas Okorocha, as winner of the 2018 governorship primary in which he contested alongside nine others, at about 3:20 AM, having said to have polled 269,524 votes, Chuks Ololo 6,428 votes, Peter Gbujie 4,855 votes, Eze Madumere 2,646 votes, Jude Ejiogu 3,456 votes, Chima Anozie 3,248 votes, George Eche 2,454 votes, and Chris Nlemoha 925 votes. The results were not, however, accepted by a coalition of aspirants called the Imo Allied forces, headed by Senator Hope Uzodinma and Eze Madumere, who claimed they were excluded from the process, even though the electoral chairman said, as he announced the results that all nine governorship aspirants were part of the process. Gulak, who earlier announced Nwosu won later returned to support the results announced by Agbaziaka.

The aggrieved party confessed to going to court to "stop" the primaries. Five of the aspirants later in October 2018 gave support to Uzodinma as being the winner, alongside a court ruling which went in his favor.

Uche Nwosu later in December 2018 dumped APC and went ahead to become AA's gubernatorial candidate for the state, but not without having to contend in a legal battle with Myke Ikoku, the party's earlier nominee for the race, and other issues. Rt. Hon. Acho Ihim, Speaker of the House of Assembly of Imo State, who led a mass deflection alongside 17 others into the party, became his running mate.

Candidates
Party nominee: Hope Uzodinma.
Running mate: .
 Uche Nwosu (Deflected)
 Chuks Ololo
 Peter Gbujie
 Eze Madumere
 Jude Ejiogu
 Chima Anozie
 George Eche
 Chris Nlemoha

Results
A total of 70 candidates registered with the Independent National Electoral Commission to contest in the election. PDP ex-lawmaker governorship aspirant, Senator Emeka Ihedioha, won election for a first term polling 273,404 votes, defeating AA's Uche Nwosu who came second with 190,364 votes, Ifeanyi Araraume of APGA third with 114,676 votes, Hope Uzodinma of APC fourth with 96,458 votes, and several minority party candidates. The AA candidate's candidature was later invalidated by a court, for violating the section 37 of the Electoral Act 2010 (as amended) by obtaining nomination from two parties, APC and AA. Likewise, the APC was said to have no candidate for the election, hence, the PDP candidate's victory.

The total number of registered voters in the state was 2,221,008 while 823,743 voters were accredited. Total number of votes cast was 739,485, while total number of valid votes was 714,355. Total rejected votes were 25,130.

By local government area
Here are the results of the election from the local government areas of the state for the two major parties. The total valid votes of 714,355 represents the 70 political parties that participated in the election. Green represents LGAs won by Ihedioha. Blue represents LGAs won by Nwosu. White represents LGAs won by others.

References 

Gubernatorial election 2019
Imo State gubernatorial election
Imo State gubernatorial election
Imo State gubernatorial elections